Wrinkle Neck Mules is an American band from Richmond, Virginia. The band has released 6 full-length records and one EP. Songwriting duties are primarily split between Andy Stepanian and Chase Heard, who are also owners of the clothing company Howler Brothers. The band keeps a limited touring schedule because the members are split between Virginia and Texas.

Discography

Full-length albums
 Minor Enough (2003)
 Pull the Brake (2006)
 The Wicks Have Met (2007) 
 Let The Lead Fly (2009) 
 Apprentice To Ghosts (2012)
 I Never Thought It Would Go This Far (2015)

EPs
 Liza (2010)

References

External links
Official site
Lower 40 Records site
Howler Brothers site
Chase Heard paintings website

Musical groups from Virginia
American southern rock musical groups
American folk rock groups
American alternative country groups
Musical groups established in 1999
1999 establishments in Virginia